Sinful is the fifth album by the rock band Angel. It was originally titled Bad Publicity and a few copies of the album with that name and a different album cover were sold before being replaced. The album went to #159 on the US Pop Album Charts in 1979.  Some consider it their most pop-oriented album.

Track listing
"Don't Take Your Love" (DiMino, Giuffria) – 3:30
"L.A. Lady" (Meadows) – 3:45
"Just Can't Take It" (DiMino, Meadows) – 3:44
"You Can't Buy Love" (Brandt, DiMino) – 3:37
"Bad Time" (DiMino, Giuffria) – 3:41
"Waited a Long Time" (Brandt, DiMino) – 3:13
"I'll Bring the Whole World to Your Door" (DiMino, Leonetti, Meadows) – 2:54
"I'll Never Fall in Love Again" (Giuffria) – 3:33
"Wild and Hot" (Meadows) – 2:59
"Lovers Live On" (Meadows, Robinson) – 2:58
"Virginia" (Meadows) – 3:58 (bonus track from the soundtrack to the motion picture Foxes)
"Walk Away Renee" (Sansome, Calilli, Brown) - 2:54 (bonus track)

Personnel
Frank DiMino - vocals
Punky Meadows - guitars
Felix Robinson - bass guitar
Barry Brandt - drums
Gregg Giuffria - keyboards

References

1979 albums
Angel (band) albums
Casablanca Records albums